Ziggy Marley is the sixth solo studio album by Jamaican reggae artist Ziggy Marley, released on May 20, 2016, on Ziggy's own label, Tuff Gong Worldwide. The album marked Ziggy's return after 2 years, following the Grammy-winning album Fly Rasta.

The first single, "Weekend's Long", was released on iTunes on February 26, 2016.

Commercial performance
The album debuted at number 99 on the Billboard 200 with 6,000 equivalent album units; it sold 5,000 copies in its first week.

Track listing
 "Start It Up"
 "Better Together"
 "Amen"
 "Love Is A Rebel" 
 "Weekend's Long"
 "Heaven Can't Take It" (featuring Stephen Marley)
 "Ceceil" 
 "I'm Not Made Of Stone"
 "Marijuanaman"
 "We Are More (Mi Amore)"
 "Butterflies"
 "We Are The People"

Charts

References

External links
Ziggy Marley's official website

Ziggy Marley albums
2016 albums
Tuff Gong albums